The 1980s (pronounced "nineteen-eighties",  shortened to "the '80s" or "the Eighties") was a decade that began January 1, 1980 and ended December 31, 1989.

The decade saw a dominance of conservatism and free market economics, and a socioeconomic change due to advances in technology and a worldwide move away from planned economies and towards laissez-faire capitalism compared to the 1970s. As economic deconstruction increased in the developed world, multiple multinational corporations associated with the manufacturing industry relocated into Thailand, Mexico, South Korea, Taiwan, and China. Japan and West Germany saw large economic growth during this decade. The AIDS epidemic became recognized in the 1980s and has since killed an estimated 39 million people. Global warming became well known to the scientific and political community in the 1980s.

The United Kingdom and the United States moved closer to supply-side economic policies, beginning a trend towards global instability of international trade that would pick up more steam in the following decade as the fall of the USSR made right-wing economic policy more powerful.

The final decade of the Cold War opened with the US-Soviet confrontation continuing largely without any interruption. Superpower tensions escalated rapidly as President Reagan scrapped the policy of détente and adopted a new, much more aggressive stance on the Soviet Union. The world came perilously close to nuclear war for the first time since the Cuban Missile Crisis in 1962, but the second half of the decade saw a dramatic easing of superpower tensions and ultimately the total collapse of Soviet communism.

Developing countries across the world faced economic and social difficulties as they suffered from multiple debt crises in the 1980s, requiring many of these countries to apply for financial assistance from the International Monetary Fund (IMF) and the World Bank. Ethiopia witnessed widespread famine in the mid-1980s during the corrupt rule of Mengistu Haile Mariam, resulting in the country having to depend on foreign aid to provide food to its population and worldwide efforts to address and raise money to help Ethiopians, such as the Live Aid concert in 1985.

Major civil discontent and violence occurred, including the Angolan Civil War, the Ethiopian Civil War, the Moro conflict, the Ugandan Bush War, the insurgency in Laos, the Iran–Iraq War, the Soviet–Afghan War, the 1982 Lebanon War, the Second Sudanese Civil War, the Lord's Resistance Army insurgency, and the First Nagorno-Karabakh War. Islamism became a powerful political force in the 1980s and many jihadist organizations, including Al Qaeda, were set up.

By 1986, nationalism was making a comeback in the Eastern Bloc, and the desire for democracy in socialist states, combined with economic recession, resulted in Mikhail Gorbachev's glasnost and perestroika, which reduced Communist Party power, legalized dissent and sanctioned limited forms of capitalism such as joint ventures with companies from capitalist countries. After tension for most of the decade, by 1988 relations between the communist and capitalist blocs had improved significantly and the Soviet Union was increasingly unwilling to defend its governments in satellite states.

1989 brought the overthrow and attempted overthrow of a number of governments led by communist parties, such as in Hungary, the Tiananmen Square protests of 1989 in China, the Czechoslovak "Velvet Revolution", Erich Honecker's East German regime, Poland's Soviet-backed government, and the violent overthrow of the Nicolae Ceaușescu regime in Romania. Destruction of the 155-km Berlin Wall, at the end of the decade, signaled a seismic geopolitical shift. The Cold War ended in the early 1990s with the successful Reunification of Germany and the USSR's demise after the August Coup of 1991.

The 1980s saw great advances in genetic and digital technology. After years of animal experimentation since 1985, the first genetic modification of 10 adult human beings took place in May 1989, a gene tagging experiment which led to the first true gene therapy implementation in September 1990. The first "designer babies", a pair of female twins, were created in a laboratory in late 1989 and born in July 1990 after being sex-selected via the controversial assisted reproductive technology procedure preimplantation genetic diagnosis. Gestational surrogacy was first performed in 1985 with the first birth in 1986, making it possible for a woman to become a biological mother without experiencing pregnancy for the first time in history.

The 1980s was also an era of tremendous population growth around the world, surpassing the 1970s and 1990s, and arguably being the largest in human history. Population growth was particularly rapid in a number of African, Middle Eastern, and South Asian countries during this decade, with rates of natural increase close to or exceeding 4% annually.

The 1980s saw the advent of the ongoing practice of sex-selective abortion in China and India as ultrasound technology permitted parents to selectively abort baby girls.

The global internet took shape in academia by the second half of the 1980s, as well as many other computer networks of both academic and commercial use such as USENET, Fidonet, and the Bulletin Board System. By 1989 the Internet and the networks linked to it were a global system with extensive transoceanic satellite links and nodes in most developed countries. Based on earlier work, from 1980 onwards Tim Berners Lee formalized the concept of the World Wide Web by 1989. Television viewing became commonplace in the Third World, with the number of TV sets in China and India increasing by 15 and 10 times respectively.

The Atari Video Computer System console became widespread in the first part of the decade, often simply called "Atari". 1980's Atari VCS port of Space Invaders was the first killer app. The video game crash of 1983 ended the system's popularity and decimated the industry until the Nintendo Entertainment System re-established the console market in North America. The hand-held Game Boy launched in 1989. Super Mario Bros. and Tetris were the decade's best selling games. Pac-Man was the highest grossing arcade game. Home computers became commonplace. The 1981 IBM PC led to a large market for IBM PC compatibles. The 1984 release of the Macintosh popularized the WIMP style of interaction.

During the 1980s, the world population grew from 4.4 to 5.3 billion people. There were approximately 1.33 billion births and 480 million deaths.

Politics and wars

Wars

The most prominent armed conflicts of the decade include:

International wars

The most notable wars of the decade include:
 The Cold War (1947–1991)
 Soviet–Afghan War (1979–1989) – a war fought between the Soviet Union and the Islamist Mujahideen Resistance in Afghanistan. The mujahideen found other support from a variety of sources including the Central Intelligence Agency of the United States (see Operation Cyclone), as well as Saudi Arabia, Pakistan and other Muslim nations through the context of the Cold War and the regional India–Pakistan conflict.
 Invasion of Grenada (1983) – a 1983 U.S.-led invasion of Grenada, triggered by a military coup which ousted a brief revolutionary government. The successful invasion led to a change of government but was controversial due to charges of American imperialism, Cold War politics, the involvement of Cuba, the unstable state of the Grenadian government, and Grenada's status as a Commonwealth realm.
 Salvadoran Civil War (1980–1992) – part of the cold war conflicts, reached its peak in the 1980s, 70,000 Salvadorans died.
 Argentina invaded the Falkland Islands, sparking the Falklands War. It occurred from April 2 to July 14, 1982, between the United Kingdom and Argentina as British forces fought to recover the islands. Britain emerged victorious and its stance in international affairs and its long-decaying reputation as a colonial power received an unexpected boost. The military junta of Argentina, on the other hand, was left humiliated by the defeat; and its leader Leopoldo Galtieri was deposed three days after the end of the war. A military investigation known as the Rattenbach Report even recommended his execution.
 Arab–Israeli conflict (early 20th century – present)
 1982 Lebanon War – the Government of Israel ordered the invasion as a response to the assassination attempt against Israel's ambassador to the United Kingdom, Shlomo Argov, by the Abu Nidal Organization and due to the constant terror attacks on northern Israel made by the terrorist organizations which resided in Lebanon. After attacking the PLO, as well as Syrian, leftist and Muslim Lebanese forces, Israel occupied southern Lebanon and eventually surrounded the PLO in west Beirut and subjected to heavy bombardment, they negotiated passage from Lebanon.
 In October 1985 eight Israeli F-15 Eagles carried out Operation Wooden Leg intending to bomb the PLO's new headquarters in Tunis, Tunisia, more than 2,000 km from Israel. The attack cost 270 lives, most of them Tunisian civilians. The attack was later condemned by the United Nations Security Council. The United States is thought to have assisted or known of the attack.
 The Iran–Iraq War took place from 1980 to 1988. Iraq was accused of using illegal chemical weapons to kill Iranian forces and against its own dissident Kurdish populations. Both sides suffered enormous casualties, but the poorly equipped Iranian armies suffered worse for it, being forced to use soldiers as young as 15 in human-wave attacks. Iran finally agreed to an armistice in 1988.
 The United States launched an aerial bombardment of Libya in 1986 in retaliation for Libyan support of terrorism and attacks on US personnel in Germany and Turkey.
 The South African Border War between South Africa and the alliance of Angola, Namibia and Zambia ended in 1989, ending over thirty years of conflict.
 The United States engaged in significant direct and indirect conflict in the decade via alliances with various groups in a number of Central and South American countries claiming that the U.S. was acting to oppose the spread of communism and end illicit drug trade. The U.S. government supported the government of Colombia's attempts to destroy its large illicit cocaine-trafficking industry and provided support for right-wing military government in the Salvadoran civil war which became controversial after the El Mozote massacre on December 11, 1981, in which U.S.-trained Salvadoran paramilitaries killed 1000 Salvadoran civilians. The United States, along with members of the Organisation of Eastern Caribbean States, invaded Grenada in 1983. The Iran–Contra affair erupted which involved U.S. interventionism in Nicaragua, resulting in members of the U.S. government being indicted in 1986. U.S. military action began against Panama in December 1989 to overthrow its dictator, Manuel Noriega resulting in 3,500 civilian casualties and the restoration of democratic rule.
 Battle of Cuito Cuanavale took place as part of the Angolan civil war and South African Border War from 1987 to 1988. The battle involved the largest fighting in Africa since World War II between military forces from Angola, Cuba (expeditionary forces) and Namibia versus military forces from South Africa and the dissident Angolan UNITA organization.
 The First Nagorno-Karabakh War between Azerbaijan and the Armenia started in 1988 and ended in 1994.
 The United States invasion of Panama in December 1989 led to the deposition of Manuel Noriega.

Civil wars and guerrilla wars
The most notable internal conflicts of the decade include:
 The Tiananmen Square protests of 1989 occurred in the People's Republic of China in 1989, in which pro-democracy protesters demanded political reform. The protests were crushed by the People's Liberation Army.
 The First Intifada (First Uprising) in the Gaza Strip and West Bank began in 1987 when Palestinian Arabs mounted large-scale protests against the Israeli military presence in the Gaza Strip and West Bank, largely inhabited by Palestinians. The First Intifada would continue until peace negotiations began between the Palestinian Liberation Organization (PLO) and the Israeli government in 1993.
 Lebanese Civil War (1975–1990) – Throughout the decade, Lebanon was engulfed in civil war between Islamic and Christian factions.
 The Kanak Socialist National Liberation Front began a violent campaign for independence in New Caledonia.
 Greenpeace's attempts to monitor French nuclear testing on Mururoa were halted by the sinking of the Rainbow Warrior.
 The Second Sudanese Civil War erupts in 1983 between the Muslim government of Sudan in the north and non-Muslim rebel secessionists in Southern Sudan. The conflict continues through the present day Darfur genocide.
 Internal conflict in Peru: The communist Túpac Amaru Revolutionary Movement starts its fight against the Peruvian state in 1980, that would continue until the end of the 1990s.
 Haitian dictator Jean-Claude Duvalier was overthrown by a popular uprising on February 6, 1986.
 The Troubles in Northern Ireland continued.

Terrorist attacks

The most notable terrorist attacks of the decade include:
 Bologna massacre in Italy on August 2, 1980, three members of the neo-fascist group Nuclei Armati Rivoluzionari detonate a time bomb at Bologna Central Station, killing 85 people.
 El Mozote massacre in El Salvador on December 11, 1981, against civilians, committed by government forces supported by the United States during their anti-guerrilla campaign against Marxist–Leninist rebels.
 The Rome and Vienna airport attacks took place on December 27, 1985, against the Israeli El Al airline. The attack was done by militants loyal to Abu Nidal, backed by the government of Libya.
 The 1983 Beirut barracks bombing – during the Lebanese Civil War two truck bombs struck separate buildings housing United States and French military forces killing 299 American and French servicemen. The organization Islamic Jihad claimed responsibility for the bombing.
 Air India Flight 182 was destroyed on June 23, 1985, by Sikh-Canadian militants. It was the biggest mass murder involving Canadians in Canada's history.
 On December 21, 1988, Pan Am Flight 103 was blown up over the village of Lockerbie, Scotland, while en route from London's Heathrow Airport to New York's JFK. The bombing killed all 259 people on board, 243 passengers and 16 crew members, plus 11 people on the ground, totaling 270 fatalities who were citizens of 21 nationalities. The bombing was and remains the worst terrorist attack on UK soil.

Coups

The most prominent coups d'état of the decade include:
 A military coup is launched in Suriname on February 25, 1980; the country's politics are dominated by the military until 1991.
 Nigeria suffered multiple military coups in 1983 and 1985.
 Sitiveni Rabuka staged two military coups in Fiji in 1987, and declared the country a republic the same year.
 The "Anti-Bureaucratic Revolution" – a series of interconnected coups d'états – take place in Yugoslavia from 1988 to 1989 through mass protests organized and committed by supporters of Serbian politician Slobodan Milošević overthrow the governments of Serbia's autonomous provinces of Kosovo and Vojvodina, and the government of Montenegro, and finally the main government of Serbia with Milošević becoming President of Serbia.

Nuclear threats

 Operation Opera – a 1981 surprise Israeli air strike that destroyed the Iraqi nuclear reactor being constructed near Baghdad. Israeli military intelligence assumed this was for the purpose of plutonium production to further an Iraqi nuclear weapons program. Israeli intelligence also believed that the summer of 1981 would be the last chance to destroy the reactor before it would be loaded with nuclear fuel.
 US President Reagan's decision to station intermediate-range nuclear missiles in Western Europe provoked mass protests involving more than one million people.

Decolonization and independence
 Following the decolonization and independence of the Commonwealth realms.
 In 1982, Canada gained official independence from the United Kingdom with the Canada Act 1982, authorized by the signature by Elizabeth II. This act severed all political dependencies of the United Kingdom in Canada (although the Queen remained the head of state).
 In 1986, Australia gained full independence from the United Kingdom with the Australia Act 1986, which severed the last remaining powers of the British government over the Australian government, including the removal of the privy council as the highest court of appeal. Australia retained the queen as head of state.
 In 1986, New Zealand and the United Kingdom fully separated New Zealand's governments from the influence of the British Parliament, resulting in New Zealand's full independence with the Constitution Act 1986 which also reorganized the New Zealand government.
 Independence was granted to Vanuatu from the British/French condominium (1980), Kiribati from joint US-British government (1981) and Palau from the United States (1986).
 Zimbabwe becomes independent from official colonial rule of the United Kingdom in 1980.
 Independence was given to Antigua and Barbuda, Belize (both 1981), and Saint Kitts and Nevis (1983) in the Caribbean; Brunei (1984) and Thailand formed a US-British government (1981) in Southeast Asia.

Prominent political events

Americas

 Ronald Reagan was elected U.S. president in 1980. In international affairs, Reagan pursued a hardline policy towards preventing the spread of communism, initiating a considerable buildup of U.S. military power to challenge the Soviet Union. He further directly challenged the Iron Curtain by demanding that the Soviet Union dismantle the Berlin Wall.
 The Reagan Administration accelerated the War on Drugs, publicized through anti-drug campaigns including the Just Say No campaign of First Lady Nancy Reagan. Drugs gained attention in the US as a serious problem in the '80s. Cocaine was relatively popular among celebrities and affluent youth, while crack, a cheaper offshoot of the drug, was linked to high crime rates in inner cities during the American crack epidemic. 
 The Professional Air Traffic Controllers Organization (1968) (PATCO) declared a strike on August 3, 1981, seeking better working conditions, better pay, and a 32-hour workweek. The strike caused considerable disruption of the U.S. air transportation system. Resolution came when Ronald Reagan fired over 11,000 striking air traffic controllers who had ignored the order, banning them from federal service for life. After seeking appeals, many of the controllers were re-hired while the FAA attempted to replace much of their air traffic control staffing. The remainder continued to be banned until President Clinton lifted the final aspects in 1993. 
 Political unrest in the province of Quebec, which, due to the many differences between the dominant francophone population and the anglophone minority, and also to francophone rights in the predominantly English-speaking Canada, came to a head in 1980 when the provincial government called a public referendum on partial separation from the rest of Canada. The referendum ended with the "no" side winning majority (59.56% no, 40.44% yes).
 Military dictatorships give way to democracy in Argentina (1983), Uruguay (1984–85), Brazil (1985–1988) and Chile (1988–89). This marked the end of the Operation Condor for 30 years.

Europe

 The European Community's enlargement continued with the accession of Greece in 1981 and Spain and Portugal in 1986.
 In 1983, Bettino Craxi became the first socialist to hold the office of Prime Minister of Italy; he remained in power until 1987, becoming one of the longest-serving Prime Ministers in the history of Italian Republic. At the end of his presidency the Mani pulite corruption scandal broke up, causing the collapse of the political system.
 Significant political reforms occurred in a number of communist countries in eastern Europe as the populations of these countries grew increasingly hostile and politically active in opposing communist governments. These reforms included attempts to increase individual liberties and market liberalization, and promises of democratic renewal. The collapse of communism in eastern Europe was generally peaceful, the exception being Romania, whose leader Nicolae Ceaușescu tried to keep the people isolated from the events happening outside the country. While making a speech in Bucharest in December 1989, he was booed and shouted down by the crowd, and then tried to flee the city with his wife Elena. Two days later, they were captured, charged with genocide, and shot on Christmas Day.
 In Yugoslavia, following the death of communist leader Josip Broz Tito in May 1980, the trend of political reform of the communist system occurred along with a trend towards ethnic nationalism and inter-ethnic hostility, especially in Serbia, beginning with the 1986 Memorandum of the Serbian Academy of Sciences and Arts followed by the agenda of Serbian communist leader Slobodan Milošević who aggressively pushed for increased political influence of Serbs in the late 1980s, condemning non-Serb Yugoslav politicians who challenged his agenda as being enemies of Serbs.
 There was continuing civil strife in Northern Ireland, including the adoption of hunger strikes by Irish Republican Army prisoners seeking the reintroduction of political status.
 Mikhail Gorbachev became leader of the Soviet Union in 1985, and initiated major reforms to the Soviet Union's government through increasing the rights of expressing political dissent and opening elections to opposition candidates (while maintaining legal dominance of the Communist Party). Gorbachev pursued negotiation with the United States to decrease tensions and eventually end the Cold War.
 During the Revolutions of 1989, most of the communist governments in Eastern Europe collapsed. The fall of the Berlin Wall in 1989 would be followed in 1990 by the German reunification. 
 The United Kingdom was governed by the Conservative Party under Prime Minister Margaret Thatcher, the first female leader of a Western country. Under her Premiership, the party introduced widespread economic reforms including the privatisation of industries and the de-regulation of stock markets echoing similar reforms of U.S. President Ronald Reagan. She was also a staunch opponent of communism, earning her the nickname The Iron Lady.
 Poor industrial relations marked the beginning of the decade; the UK miners' strike (1984–85) was a major industrial action affecting the UK coal industry. The strike by the National Union of Mineworkers (NUM) was led by Arthur Scargill, although some NUM members considered it to be unconstitutional and did not observe it. The BBC has referred to the strike as "the most bitter industrial dispute in British history." At its height, the strike involved 142,000 mineworkers, making it the biggest since the 1926 General Strike.
 In November 1982, Leonid Brezhnev, who had led the Soviet Union since 1964, died. He was followed in quick succession by Yuri Andropov, the former KGB chief, and Konstantin Chernenko, both of whom were in poor health during their short tenures in office.

Asia
 Following the assassination of Park Chung-hee, South Korean president Chun Doo Hwan came to power at the end of 1979 and ruled as a dictator until his presidential term expired in 1987. He was responsible for the Gwangju Uprising in May 1980 when police and soldiers battled armed protesters. Relations with North Korea showed little sign of improvement during the 1980s. In 1983, when Chun was in Burma, a bomb apparently planted by North Korean agents killed a number of South Korean government officials. After leaving office, he was succeeded by Roh Tae Woo, the first democratic ruler of the country, which saw its international prestige greatly rise with hosting the Olympics in 1988. Roh pursued a policy of normalizing relations with China and the Soviet Union, but had to face militant left-wing student groups who demanded reunification with North Korea and the withdrawal of US troops.
 In the Philippines, after almost 20 years of dictatorship, Philippine president Ferdinand Marcos left the presidency and was replaced by Corazon Aquino through the "People Power Revolution" from February 22 to 25, 1986. This has been considered by some a peaceful revolution despite the fact that the Armed Forces of the Philippines issued an order to disperse the crowds on EDSA (the main thoroughfare in Metro Manila).
 Democratization in South Korea and Taiwan, having lasted 42 and 27 years under the authoritarian regime since the end of World War II and the Korean War (including the lifting of martial law in Taiwan and the first direct presidential elections in South Korea).
 The 1988 Summer Olympics were held in South Korea, the first time the country hosted them.

Assassinations and attempts

Prominent assassinations, targeted killings, and assassination attempts include:

Disasters

Natural disasters

 Mount St. Helens erupted in Washington, U.S. on May 18, 1980, killing 57 people.
 On October 17, 1989, the Loma Prieta earthquake struck the San Francisco Bay Area during Game 3 of the 1989 World Series, gaining worldwide attention. Sixty-five people were killed and thousands injured, with major structural damage on freeways and buildings and broken gas-line fires in San Francisco, California. The cost of the damage totaled $13 billion (1989 USD).
 The 1988–89 North American drought decimated the US with many parts of the country affected. This was the worst drought to hit the United States in many years. The drought caused $60 billion in damage (between $80 billion and $120 billion for 2008 USD). The concurrent heat waves killed 5,800 to 17,000 people in the United States.
 Hurricane Allen (1980), Hurricane Alicia (1983), Hurricane Gilbert (1988), Hurricane Joan (1988), and Hurricane Hugo (1989) were some notably destructive Atlantic hurricanes of the 1980s.
 Other natural disasters of the 1980s include the 1982–1983 El Niño which brought destructive weather to most of the world; the 1985 Mexico City earthquake, which registered 8.0 on the moment magnitude scale and devastated Mexico City and other areas throughout central Mexico; the 1985 Nevado del Ruiz lahar in Colombia; the 1986 Lake Nyos limnic eruption in Cameroon; and the 1988 Armenian earthquake, which rocked the Caucasus region of the USSR.

Non-natural disasters

 On April 25, 1980, Dan-Air Flight 1008 crashed on approach to Tenerife in the Canary Islands. All 146 people on board were killed.
 On August 19, 1980, Saudia Flight 163 caught fire moments after takeoff from the Saudi Arabian capital of Riyadh. The flight quickly returned to the airport, but evacuation of the plane was delayed and all 301 people aboard died.
 On July 9, 1982, Pan Am Flight 759 was forced down by a wind shear microburst, killing 153 people.
 In 1984, the Bhopal disaster resulted from a toxic MIC gas leak at the Union Carbide plant in Bhopal, India, killing 3,000 immediately and ultimately claiming 15,000–20,000 lives.
 On September 1, 1983, Soviet Union fighter jets shot down Korean Air Lines Flight 007, which was carrying 269 people, none of whom survived.
 On August 2, 1985, Delta Air Lines Flight 191 crashed on approach to Dallas/Fort Worth International Airport in Texas. 137 people were killed while 27 survived.
 On June 23, 1985, Air India Flight 182, flight from Montreal Canada is blown up over Irish waters by a bomb placed in the luggage compartment. This was the greatest act of terrorism until the September 11 attacks of 2001.
 Japan Airlines Flight 123, carrying 524 people, crashed on August 12, 1985, while on a flight from Tokyo to Osaka killing 520 of the people on board, leaving four survivors. This was, and still is, the worst single-plane crash ever.
 On December 12, 1985, Arrow Air Flight 1285 crashed seconds after lifting off from Gander, Newfoundland. All 256 people on board, many of them U.S. servicemen returning home from duty overseas, perished.
 On January 28, 1986, the NASA Space Shuttle Challenger disintegrated 73 seconds after launch, killing all of the crew on board. This was the first disaster involving the destruction of a NASA space shuttle. A faulty O-ring was the cause of the accident.
 On April 26, 1986, the Chernobyl disaster, a large-scale nuclear meltdown in the Ukrainian SSR, Soviet Union, spread a large amount of radioactive material across Europe, killing 47 people, dooming countless others to future radiation-related cancer, and causing the displacement of 300,000 people.
 On June 14, 1986, Fantasyland's Mindbender inside West Edmonton Mall, derails and kills 3 people, injuring one, and slams into a concrete post.
 On August 31, 1986, Aeroméxico Flight 498 crashed after colliding with a private Piper Cherokee over Cerritos, California, killing everyone on both airplanes and several others on the ground. On the same day, the Soviet passenger ship Admiral Nakhimov sank after colliding with the bulk carrier Pyotr Vasev in the Black Sea, killing 423 people.
On September 27, 1986 Cliff Burton died in a bus crash while on tour with his band, Metallica
 On May 9, 1987, an uncontained engine failure on LOT Flight 5055 caused an in-flight fire on board the airliner, which subsequently crashed, killing all 183 passengers and crew.
 On August 16, 1987, Northwest Airlines Flight 255 crashed almost immediately after takeoff from Detroit Wayne Airport in Michigan, killing 156 people.
 On November 28, 1987, a fire broke out on South African Airways Flight 295, eventually causing the aircraft to crash into the Indian Ocean. All 159 aboard were killed.
 On December 7, 1987, 43 people were killed when an irate former USAir employee went on a rampage aboard PSA Flight 1771.
 On December 20, 1987, the Philippine passenger ferry MV Doña Paz burned and sank after colliding with the oil tanker MT Vector. With an estimated death toll of over 4,000, this was and remains the world's deadliest peacetime maritime disaster.
 On July 3, 1988, Iran Air Flight 655 was shot down by the U.S. missile cruiser USS Vincennes over the Strait of Hormuz, killing all 290 people on the plane. The event is one of the most controversial aviation occurrences of all time, with the true cause disputed between the Americans and the Iranians.
 On December 21, 1988, an American passenger 747 airliner en route from Frankfurt to Detroit (via London and New York) Pan Am Flight 103 was destroyed by a bomb while it was flying over Lockerbie, Scotland, killing the 259 passengers and crew members on board and 11 people on the ground. This was the worst terrorist attack to have occurred on British soil. 
 On March 24, 1989, the oil tanker Exxon Valdez ran aground on Bligh Reef in Alaska's Prince William Sound spilling an estimated equivalent of 260,000 to 750,000 barrels of crude oil. Although not among the largest oil spills in history, its remote and sensitive location made it one of the most devastating ecological disasters ever. The after effects of the spill continue to be felt to this day.
 On April 15, 1989, The Hillsborough disaster occurs during a FA Cup Semi-Final in Sheffield, England fatally crushing 96 football fans and injuring nearly 1,000 more.
 On July 19, 1989, United Airlines Flight 232, carrying 296 people, suffered an in-flight engine failure and was forced to crash-land at Sioux City, Iowa. 185 survived, while 111 were killed when the plane burst into flames upon touchdown.

Science and technology

Medicine and biology
The 1980s had many fundamental advances in medicine and biology. The first surrogate pregnancy of an unrelated child took place on April 13, 1986, in Michigan. The first genetically modified crops, tobacco (Nicotiana) plants were grown in China in 1988.

Gene therapy techniques became established by the end of the 1980s, allowing gene tagging and gene therapy to become a possibility, both of which were first performed in human beings in May 1989 and September 1990, respectively.

Electronics and computers
Arcade and video games had been growing in popularity since the late 1970s, and by 1982 were a major industry. But a variety of factors, including a glut of low-quality games and the rise of home computers, caused a tremendous crash in late 1983. For the next three years, the video game market practically ceased to exist in the US. But in the second half of the decade, it would be revived by Nintendo, whose Famicom console and mascot Mario had been enjoying considerable success in Japan since 1983. Renamed the Nintendo Entertainment System, it would claim 90% of the American video game market by 1989. The 1980s are considered to be the decade when video games achieved massive popularity. In 1980, Pac-Man was introduced to the arcades, and became one of the most popular video games of all time. Also in 1980, Game & Watch was created; it was not one of the most well known game systems, but it facilitated mini-games and was concurrent with the NES. Donkey Kong, released in 1981, was a smash arcade hit and market breakthrough for Nintendo. Super Mario Bros., Super Mario Bros. 2, Super Mario Bros. 3, The Legend of Zelda, and the Mega Man series would become major hits for the console.

The personal computer experienced explosive growth in the 1980s, transitioning from a hobbyist's toy to a full-fledged consumer product. The IBM PC, launched in 1981, became the dominant computer for professional users. Commodore created the most popular home computers of both 8-bit and 16-bit generations. MSX standard was the dominant computer platform in Japan and in most parts of Asia. Apple Computer superseded its Apple II and Lisa models by introducing the first Macintosh computer in 1984. It was the first commercially successful personal computer to use a graphical user interface (GUI) and mouse, which started to become general features in computers after the middle of the decade. Electronics and computers were also at the forefront of the advertising industry, with many commercials like "1984" from Apple achieving acclaim and pop-culture relevance.

Walkman and boomboxes, invented during the late 1970s, became very popular as they were introduced to various countries in the early 1980s, and had a profound impact on the music industry and youth culture. Consumer VCRs and video rental stores became commonplace as VHS won out over the competing Betamax standard. In addition, in the early 1980s various companies began selling compact, modestly priced synthesizers to the public. This, along with the development of Musical Instrument Digital Interface (MIDI), made it easier to integrate and synchronize synthesizers and other electronic instruments, like drum machines, for use in musical composition.

High definition television (HDTV) of both the analog and digital variety were first developed in the 1980s though their use did not become widespread until the mid-2000s.

In 1981, Hayes Microcomputer Products started selling the Smartmodem. The Smartmodem paved the way for the modern modems that exist today, mainly because it was the first modem to transform what had previously required a two-stage process into a process involving only one stage. The Smartmodem contributed to the rise in popularity of BBS systems in the 80s and early 90s, which were the main way to connect to remote computers and perform various social and entertainment activities before the Internet and the World Wide Web finally became popular in the mid-1990s.

Information technology 
 During the decade Microsoft released the operating systems MS-DOS (1981), Windows 1.0 (1985), and Windows 2.0 (1987).
 The CD - the most basic CD ("Digital Audio Compact Disc") was released in October 1982 for distribution and listening to digital audio, and at the time contained up to 74 minutes of music.
 TCP/IP: ARPANET officially changed its main protocol from NCP to TCP/IP on January 1, 1983, when the new protocols were activated. The TCP/IP protocol will become the dominant communications protocol from then onwards, and would be used as the foundation on which the Internet would be based.
 The GNU Project (1983). The Free Software Foundation (1985).
 FidoNet - In 1984, FidoNet was launched, enabling BBS users to send private messages (e-mails) and public messages (in the forum) between all BBS systems that were connected to the FidoNet network, in addition to sending files to each other. The rise in popularity and availability of the Internet around the world around the mid-1990s eventually contributed to the irrelevance of FidoNet.
 World Wide Web - In 1989, the British computer scientist Tim Berners-Lee first proposed a project to his employer CERN, based on the concept of hypertext, to facilitate sharing and updating information among researchers. In mid-November 1989 he would develop the first successful communication between a Hypertext Transfer Protocol (HTTP) client and server via the internet. In the coming years Berners-Lee developed the system which would later become the foundation of the World Wide Web.

Space exploration

American interplanetary probes continued in the 1980s, the Voyager duo being the most known. After making a flyby of Jupiter in 1979, they went near Saturn in 1980–1981. Voyager 2 reached Uranus in 1986 (just a few days before the Challenger disaster), and Neptune in 1989 before the probes exited the solar system.

No American probes were launched to Mars in the 1980s, and the Viking probes, launched there in 1975, completed their operations by 1982. The Soviets launched two Mars probes in 1988, but they failed.

The arrival of Halley's Comet in 1986 was met by a series of Soviet, Japanese and European Space Agency (ESA) probes, namely Halley Armada.

After a six-year hiatus, American space flights with astronauts resumed with the launch of the space shuttle Columbia in April 1981. The shuttle program progressed smoothly from there, with three more orbiters entering service in 1983–1985. But that all came to an end with the tragic loss of the Challenger (STS-51-L) on January 28, 1986, taking with it seven astronauts, including Christa McAuliffe, who was to have been the first teacher in space. In full view of the world, a faulty O-ring on the right solid rocket booster allowed hot gases to burn through the external fuel tank and cause it to explode, destroying the shuttle in the process. Extensive efforts were made to improve NASA's increasingly careless management practices, and to make the shuttle safer. Flights resumed with the launch of Discovery in September 1988.

The Soviet program with cosmonauts went well during the decade, experiencing only minor setbacks. The Salyut 6 space station, launched in 1977, was replaced by Salyut 7 in 1982. Then came Mir in 1986, which ended up operating for more than a decade, and was destined to be the last in the line of Soviet space stations that had begun in 1971. One of the Soviet Union's last "superprojects" was the Buran space shuttle; it was only used once, in 1988.

Automobiles
The American auto industry began in the 1980s in a thoroughly grim situation, faced with poor quality control, rising import competition, and a severe economic downturn. Chrysler and American Motors (AMC) were near bankruptcy, and Ford was little better off. Only GM continued with business as usual. But the auto makers recovered with the economy by 1983, and in 1985 auto sales in the United States hit a new record. However, the Japanese were now a major presence, and would begin manufacturing cars in the US to get around tariffs. In 1986, Hyundai became the first Korean auto maker to enter the American market. In the same year, the Yugoslavian-built Yugo was brought to the US, but the car was so small and cheap, that it became the subject of jokes. It was sold up to 1991, when economic sanctions against Yugoslavia forced its withdrawal from the American market.

As the decade progressed, cars became smaller and more efficient in design. In 1983, Ford design teams began to incorporate aerodynamic styling to decrease drag while in motion. The Thunderbird was one of the first cars to receive these design changes. In 1985, Ford released the Taurus with a design that was revolutionary among domestic mass market automobiles.

General Motors began suffering significant losses in the late 1980s, partially the result of chairman Roger Smith's restructuring attempts, and partially because of increasingly dated cars. An example were customers who increasingly purchased European luxury cars rather than Cadillacs. In 1985, GM started Saturn (the first new American make since the Edsel), with the goal of producing high-quality import fighters. Production would not begin until 1990.

Chrysler introduced its new compact, front-wheel drive K-cars in 1981. Under the leadership of Lee Iacocca, the company turned a profit again the following year, and by 1983 paid off its government loans. A succession of models using this automobile platform followed. The most significant were the minivans in 1984. These proved a to be popular and they would dominate the van market for more than a decade. In 1987, Chrysler purchased the Italian makes of Lamborghini and Maserati. In the same year, Chrysler bought AMC from Renault laying to rest the last significant independent U.S. automaker, but acquiring the hugely profitable Jeep line and continuing the Eagle brand until the late 1990s.

The DMC DeLorean was the brainchild of John DeLorean, a flamboyant former GM executive. Production of the gull-winged sports car began in Northern Ireland in 1981. John DeLorean was arrested in October 1982 in a sting operation where he was attempting to sell cocaine to save his struggling company. He was acquitted of all charges in 1984, but too late for the DeLorean Motor Company, which closed down in 1983. The DeLorean gained renewed fame afterward as the time machine in the Back to the Future film trilogy.

The imposition of CAFE fuel-mileage standards in 1979 spelled the end of big-block engines, but performance cars and convertibles reemerged in the 1980s. Turbochargers were widely used to boost the performance of small cars, and technology from fuel injection began to take over from the widely used application of carburetors by the late 1980s. Front-wheel drive also became dominant.

The Eighties marked the decline of European brands in North America by the end of the decade. Renault, Citroen, and Peugeot ceased importation by the end of the decade. Alfa Romeo would continue until 1993. Fiat also ceased imports to North America in the Eighties.

Economics
 The early 1980s was marked by a severe global economic recession that affected much of the developed world.
 Inflation peaked in the U.S. in April 1980 at 14.76% and subsequently fell to a low of 1.10% in December 1986 but then rebounded to 4.65% at the end of the decade.
 Finland's economy grew by almost the fastest pace in the world, which eventually culminated in the recession of the 1990s Finnish economy. In Finland, the 1980s were called the "Nousukausi", or "economic upswing".
 International debt crisis in developing countries, reliance of these countries on aid from the International Monetary Fund.
 Revival of laissez faire/neoliberal economics in the developed world led by the UK and US governments emphasising reduced government intervention, lower taxes and deregulation of the stock markets associated with an economic revival in the mid- to late-1980s. Consumers became more sophisticated in their tastes (a trend begun in the 1960s), and things such as European cars and designer clothing became fashionable in the US.
 Brazil and Mexico suffers from a debt crisis in Latin America starting in 1982 under President João Figueiredo and Miguel de la Madrid. Economic problems worsened between 1979 and 1985 by firing and resignation of most officials of the Brazilian and Mexican government after the Diretas Já movement in 1984, and a failed response of emergency aid in the Mexico City earthquake just after the 175th anniversary of independence holiday in 1985. Tancredo Neves (later succeeded by José Sarney three months later) and Carlos Salinas de Gortari won a direct presidential election in 1985 marked the end of a 21-year military dictatorship, and a controversial presidential election in 1988 amid charges of voter fraud, bribery, corruption and other abuses of power.
 Enactment of the Canada–United States Free Trade Agreement in 1989 to further establish a strong economic bond between the two prosperous neighbor countries of North America.
 In the Soviet Union, the eleventh Five-Year Plan was initiated in 1981 during a period of economic stagnation that began in the late 1970s. The Plan was a near failure, as most of the targets were not met. With the ascent of Mikhail Gorbachev as General Secretary of the Communist Party, the twelfth Five-Year Plan sought to accelerate and restructure the Soviet economy through reforms to decentralize production and distribution systems.
 Under the leadership of Deng Xiaoping, China embarked on extensive reforms in the 1980s, opening the country's economy to the West and allowing capitalist enterprises to operate in a market socialist system. The corruption of Communist Party leadership was met by dissent from students and workers in the Tiananmen Square protests of 1989 which were suppressed by the People's Liberation Army.
 The Solidarity movement began in Poland in 1980, involving workers demanding political liberalization and democracy in Poland. Attempts by the Communist government to prevent the rise of the Solidarity movement failed and negotiations between the movement and the government took place. Solidarity would be instrumental in encouraging people in other communist states to demand political reform.
 The financial world and the stock market were glamorized in a way they had not been since the 1920s, and figures like Donald Trump and Michael Milken were widely seen as symbols of the decade. Widespread fear of Japanese economic strength would grip the United States in the '80s.
 The "Black Monday" stock market crash on October 19, 1987, decreased the value of the Dow Jones Industrial Average by more than 22%, causing widespread secondary drops in world markets.
 During the 1980s, for the first time in world history, transpacific trade (with East Asia, such as China, and Latin America, primarily with Mexico) equaled that of transatlantic trade (with Western Europe or with neighboring Canada), solidifying American economic power.
 The Savings and Loan crisis and Keating five scandal.
  The phrase Big Bang, used in reference to the sudden deregulation of financial markets, was coined to describe measures, including abolition of fixed commission charges and of the distinction between stockjobbers and stockbrokers on the London Stock Exchange and change from open-outcry to electronic, screen-based trading, effected by Margaret Thatcher in 1986.

Popular culture
The most prominent events and trends in popular culture of the decade (particularly in the Anglosphere) include:

Music

In the United States, MTV was launched and music videos began to have a larger effect on the record industry. Pop artists such as Michael Jackson, Whitney Houston, Duran Duran, Prince, Cyndi Lauper and Madonna mastered the format and helped turn this new product into a profitable business. New wave and synthpop were developed by many British and American artists, and became popular phenomena throughout the decade, especially in the early and mid-1980s. Music grew fragmented and combined into subgenres such as house, goth, and rap metal.

The advent of numerous new technologies had a significant impact on 1980s music, and led to a distinct production aesthetic that included synthesizer sounds, drum machines and drum reverb.

Michael Jackson was one of the icons of the 1980s and his leather jacket, white glove, and Moonwalk dance were often imitated. Jackson's 1982 album Thriller became—and currently remains—the best-selling album of all time, with sales estimated by various sources as somewhere between 65 and 110 million copies worldwide. His 1987 album Bad sold over 45 million copies and became the first album to have five number-one singles chart on the Billboard Hot 100. Jackson had the most number-one singles throughout the decade (9), and spent the most weeks at number one (27 weeks). His 1987 Bad World Tour grossed over $125 million worldwide, making it the highest grossing world tour by a solo artist during the decade. Jackson earned numerous awards and titles during the 1980s, the most notable of which were a record eight Grammy Awards and eight American Music Awards in 1984, and the honor of "Artist of the Decade" by U.S. President George H.W. Bush. Jackson was arguably the biggest star during this time, and would eventually sell more than one billion records around the world.

Prince was a popular star of the 1980s and the most successful chart act of the decade. His breakthrough album 1999, released in 1982, produced three top-ten hits and the album itself charted at number nine on the Billboard 200. His sixth studio album Purple Rain was an international success, boosting Prince to superstardom and selling over 25 million copies worldwide. The album produced the US number-one singles, "When Doves Cry" and "Let's Go Crazy" and sold 13 million copies in the U.S. as of 1996. Prince released an album every year for the rest of the decade, all charting within the top ten, with the exception of Lovesexy. In the 1990s, he infamously changed his name to an unpronounceable symbol in response to a record dispute with Warner Brothers. He went on to sell over 120 million records worldwide and win seven Grammy Awards.

Madonna and Whitney Houston were groundbreaking female artists of the decade. The keyboard synthesizer and drum machine were among the most popular instruments in music during the 1980s, especially in new wave music. After the 1980s, electronic instruments continued to be the main component of mainstream pop.

Hard rock, heavy metal, and glam metal became some of the most dominant music genres of the decade, peaking with the arrival of such bands as Mötley Crüe, Guns N' Roses, Metallica, Iron Maiden, Bon Jovi, Def Leppard, Poison, Europe, Megadeth, Slayer, Anthrax, and virtuoso guitarists such as Joe Satriani and Yngwie Malmsteen. The scene also helped 1970s hard rock artists such as AC/DC, Heart, Ozzy Osbourne, Black Sabbath, Aerosmith, Alice Cooper, Blue Öyster Cult, Deep Purple, Queen, Van Halen, KISS, Ronnie James Dio, Rush and Judas Priest reach a new generation of fans.

The 1980s were also known for song parodies becoming more mainstream, a trend led by parodic musician "Weird Al" Yankovic. He was best known for his Michael Jackson parodies "Eat It" and "Fat" as well as other parodies like "Another One Rides The Bus" (parody of "Another One Bites The Dust" by Queen).

By 1989, the hip hop scene had evolved, gaining recognition and exhibiting a stronger influence on the music industry. This time period is also considered part of the golden age of hip hop. The Beastie Boys, Public Enemy, Run-D.M.C., Grandmaster Flash, the Furious Five, Boogie Down Productions, N.W.A, LL Cool J, De La Soul, A Tribe Called Quest, EPMD, Eric B. & Rakim, Ice-T, DJ Jazzy Jeff & The Fresh Prince, 2 Live Crew, Tone Lōc, Biz Markie, the Jungle Brothers, The Sugar Hill Gang and others experienced success in this genre.

Country music advanced into a new realm of popularity with youth appeal and record-breaking marks. Groundbreaking artists such as Alabama, Hank Williams, Jr., Reba McEntire, George Strait, Ricky Skaggs, Janie Fricke, The Judds, and Randy Travis achieved multiple platinum and award status, foreshadowing the genre's popularity explosion in the 1990s. Country legends from past decades, however; such as George Jones, Waylon Jennings, Willie Nelson, Conway Twitty, the Oak Ridge Boys, Kenny Rogers, Dolly Parton, Merle Haggard, Don Williams, Crystal Gayle, Ronnie Milsap, Barbara Mandrell, and the Statler Brothers; also continued to score hits throughout the decade.

The techno style of electronic dance music emerged in Detroit, Michigan, during the mid- to late 1980s. The house music style, another form of electronic dance music, emerged in Chicago, Illinois, in the early 1980s. It was initially popularized in mid-1980s discothèques catering to the African-American, Latino and gay communities, first in Chicago, then in New York City and Detroit. It eventually reached Europe before becoming infused in mainstream pop and dance music worldwide.

Punk rock continued to make strides in the musical community. With bands leading the significance of this period such as Black Flag, Bad Brains, Minor Threat, Suicidal Tendencies, D.O.A., Bad Religion, Minutemen, Social Distortion, and Dead Kennedys, it gave birth to many subgenres like hardcore, which has continued to be moderately successful, giving birth in turn to a few counterculture movements, most notably the Straight Edge movement which began in the early era of this decade. College rock caught on in the underground scene of the 1980s in a nationwide movement with a distinct D.I.Y approach. Bands like the Pixies, R.E.M., The Replacements, Sonic Youth, XTC, The Smiths, Echo & the Bunnymen, Hüsker Dü, The Stone Roses, The Jesus and Mary Chain etc. experienced success in this genre. The 1980s also saw the birth of the grunge genre, with the arrival of such bands as Soundgarden, Green River, Melvins, Screaming Trees, Malfunkshun, Skin Yard, The U-Men, Blood Circus, Nirvana, Tad, Mudhoney, Mother Love Bone and Alice in Chains (who formed in 1987, but did not release their first album until three years later).

Several notable musical artists died of unnatural causes in the 1980s: Bon Scott, at the time lead singer of rock band AC/DC, died of acute alcohol poisoning on February 19, 1980; English drummer John Bonham of the rock band Led Zeppelin also died that year in a similar manner; The Beatles member John Lennon was fatally shot outside his home in New York City on the night of December 8, 1980; Tim Hardin died of a heroin overdose on December 29, 1980; Reggae musician Bob Marley died from a lentiginous skin melanoma on May 11, 1981; Harry Chapin died of a car accident on July 16, 1981; Motown singer Marvin Gaye was shot dead by his father at his home in Los Angeles on April 1, 1984, one day before what would've been his 45th birthday; Ozzy Osbourne's guitarist Randy Rhoads died in an airplane crash on March 19, 1982; Karen Carpenter died from heart failure caused by her anorexia condition on February 4, 1983; Metallica bassist Cliff Burton was killed in a bus accident in Sweden on September 27, 1986; and lastly, Andy Gibb died in 1988 as a result of myocarditis.

In 1984, the British supergroup Band Aid was formed to raise aid and awareness of the economic plight of Ethiopia. In 1985's Live Aid concert, featuring many artists, promoted attention and action to send food aid to Ethiopia whose people were suffering from a major famine.

Film

 Oscar winners for Best Picture: Ordinary People (1980), Chariots of Fire (1981), Gandhi (1982), Terms of Endearment (1983), Amadeus (1984), Out of Africa (1985), Platoon (1986), The Last Emperor (1987), Rain Man (1988), Driving Miss Daisy (1989).
 The highest-grossing films of the decade are (in order from highest to lowest domestic grossing): E.T. the Extra-Terrestrial, Return of the Jedi, The Empire Strikes Back, Indiana Jones and the Last Crusade, Batman, Rain Man, Raiders of the Lost Ark, Ghostbusters, Back to the Future, Who Framed Roger Rabbit, Top Gun, Indiana Jones and the Temple of Doom, Back to the Future Part II, "Crocodile" Dundee, Fatal Attraction and Beverly Hills Cop.

The 1980s saw the return of studio-driven films, coming from the filmmaker-driven New Hollywood era of the 1970s. The period was when 'high concept' films gained popularity, where movies were to be easily marketable and understandable, and, therefore, they had short cinematic plots that could be summarized in one or two sentences. The modern Hollywood blockbuster is the most popular film format from the 1980s. Producer Don Simpson is usually credited with the creation of the high-concept picture of the modern Hollywood blockbuster. In the mid-1980s, a wave of British directors, including Ridley Scott, Alan Parker, Adrian Lyne and Tony Scott (with the latter directing a number of Don Simpson films) ushered in a new era of blockbusters using the crowd-pleasing skills they had honed in UK television commercials.

The 1980s also saw the golden age of "teen flicks" and also spawned the Brat Pack films, many of which were directed by John Hughes. Films such as Class, The Breakfast Club, Fast Times at Ridgemont High, Mannequin, Porky's, Pretty in Pink, Sixteen Candles, St. Elmo's Fire, Ferris Bueller's Day Off, Weird Science, and Valley Girl were popular teen comedies of the era and launched the careers of several major celebrities such as: Emilio Estevez, Anthony Michael Hall, Forest Whitaker, Jennifer Jason Leigh, Andrew McCarthy, Judd Nelson, Molly Ringwald, Sean Penn, Nicolas Cage and Michael J. Fox. Other popular films included About Last Night..., Bill & Ted's Excellent Adventure, Dirty Dancing, Flashdance, Footloose, Raging Bull and St. Elmo's Fire which also launched the careers of high-profile celebrities like Demi Moore, Joe Pesci, Keanu Reeves, Kevin Bacon, Rob Lowe, Patrick Swayze, and River Phoenix.

Horror films were a popular genre during the decade, with several notable horror franchises being born during the 1980s. Among the most popular were the Child's Play, A Nightmare on Elm Street, Friday the 13th, Hellraiser, and Poltergeist franchises. Aside from these films, the concept of the B horror film gave rise to a plethora of horror films that went on to earn a cult status. An example of such is the 1981 film The Evil Dead, which marked the directorial debut of Sam Raimi. Comedy horror films such as Beetlejuice and Gremlins also gained cult status.

Several action film franchises were also introduced during the 1980s. The most popular of these were the Indiana Jones, Die Hard, Lethal Weapon, and Rambo franchises. Other action films from the decade which are of notable status include The Terminator, Aliens, Escape from New York, Red Dawn, Predator, and RoboCop. These films propelled the careers of modern celebrities such as Arnold Schwarzenegger, Bruce Willis, Sigourney Weaver, Mel Gibson, Danny Glover, and Charlie Sheen to international recognition. On the other side of the globe, Hong Kong action cinema and martial arts films were being revolutionized by a new wave of inventive filmmakers that include Jackie Chan, Sammo Hung, Tsui Hark, and John Woo, while the American martial arts film movement was being led by actors like Chuck Norris, Jean-Claude Van Damme and Steven Seagal.

Five more James bond films were released, with Roger Moore continuing in the role in For Your Eyes Only, Octopussy, and A View To A Kill, before handing over the role to Timothy Dalton who starred in The Living Daylights and Licence To Kill.

A significant development in the home media business is the establishment of The Criterion Collection in 1984, an American company "dedicated to gathering the greatest films from around the world and publishing them in editions that offer the highest technical quality". Through their releases, they were able to introduce what is now a standard to home video: letterboxing to retain the original aspect ratio, film commentaries and supplements/special features.

Although animated feature films did not gain mainstream popularity until the mid to late-1990s due to public preference of television animation, some important films were produced during the decade. After leaving Disney in 1979, Don Bluth formed his own studio and went on direct The Secret of NIMH, An American Tail, The Land Before Time and All Dogs Go To Heaven. At the same time, the Disney studio wasn't having good times and almost bankrupted after The Black Cauldron bombed at the box office. However, in later years, they slowly recovered with the modest success of Ron Clements and John Musker directed The Great Mouse Detective and eventually regained public confidence following the release of  The Little Mermaid. Other animated films from the decade also gained notable status: Films based on popular works include Bon Voyage, Charlie Brown (and Don't Come Back!!),  Heavy Metal, The Adventures of Mark Twain, The Care Bears Movie, The Transformers: The Movie, The Chipmunk Adventure and Daffy Duck's Quackbusters; while original films include The Last Unicorn, The Plague Dogs, Rock & Rule, Fire and Ice, The Brave Little Toaster and The BFG.

The 1980s also saw a surge of Japanese anime films: Hayao Miyazaki's The Castle of Cagliostro and Nausicaä of the Valley of the Wind were extremely successful enough to lead the foundation of Studio Ghibli which would then produce several successful films of the decade including Castle in the Sky, My Neighbor Totoro, Grave of the Fireflies and Kiki's Delivery Service. Other well-known anime films of that decade include Golgo 13: The Professional, Macross: Do You Remember Love?, Lensman, Vampire Hunter D, Akira, Little Nemo: Adventures in Slumberland and the Urusei Yatsura film series. Additionally, the first-ever theatrical animated franchise: the Doraemon film series (based on the anime and manga series of the same name) began in 1980 with the release of Doraemon: Nobita's Dinosaur.

Television

Music video channel MTV was launched in the United States in 1981 and had a profound impact on the music industry and popular culture further ahead, especially during its early run in the 1980s and early 1990s.

The 1980s was a decade of transformation in television. Cable television became more accessible and therefore, more popular. By the middle of the decade, almost 70% of the U.S. population had cable television and over 85% were paying for cable services such as HBO or Showtime. People who lived in rural areas where cable TV service was not available could still access cable channels through a large (and expensive) satellite dish, which, by the mid-1990s, was phased out in favor of the small rooftop dishes that offer DirecTV and Dish Network services.

The 1980s also saw the debut of prime-time soap operas such as Dallas, its spin-off Knots Landing, Dynasty, Falcon Crest, EastEnders and Neighbours.

During the 1980s, sitcoms were also coming popular, including Full House, Bosom Buddies, Too Close for Comfort, Family Ties, Cheers, Newhart, Night Court and Married... With Children, which was the first show to hit the Fox airwaves on launch in 1987.

In 1985, two sitcoms premiered on the same day: The Golden Girls, starring Bea Arthur, Betty White, Rue McClanahan and Estelle Getty, which lasted for seven seasons and was also the first comedy ever to feature four older women in title TV roles, and 227, which was originally the sitcom vehicle for Marla Gibbs, who previously starred in The Jeffersons, and which also launched Jackée Harry's career. Sketch comedy and variety show Saturday Night Live experienced turbulence for much of the 1980s, however, it propelled the successful careers of cast members like Bill Murray, Eddie Murphy, Martin Short, and Julia Louis-Dreyfus.

The year 1986 marked the debut of the legal drama Matlock, which was the comeback vehicle for Andy Griffith, as the title character, which also launched the careers of Nancy Stafford, Clarence Gilyard Jr. and Daniel Roebuck.

TV talk shows expanded in popularity; The Tonight Show Starring Johnny Carson remained popular into its third decade, and some of the most viewed newer shows were hosted by Geraldo Rivera, Arsenio Hall and David Letterman.

TV documentary shows of the 1980s that were popular included Frontline, Michael Palin: Around the World in 80 Days, Unsolved Mysteries with Robert Stack, and Rescue 911 with William Shatner.

The 1980s also was prominent for spawning several popular animated shows such as The Smurfs, ThunderCats, Voltron, The Transformers, Masters of the Universe, G.I. Joe: A Real American Hero, Fist of the North Star, Inspector Gadget, Muppet Babies, Dragon Ball, Teenage Mutant Ninja Turtles, DuckTales, Garfield and Friends, as well as the earliest Simpsons shorts which aired on The Tracey Ullman Show.

Sports

 The 1980 Summer Olympics in Moscow were disrupted by a boycott led by the United States and 64 other countries in protest of the 1979 Soviet invasion of Afghanistan.
 The 1980 Winter Olympics were well remembered for the Miracle on Ice, where a young United States hockey team defeated the heavily favored Soviet Red Army team and went on to win the gold medal.
 The New York Islanders won the Stanley Cup for 4 straight years in 1980, 1981, 1982, and 1983. The Islanders also became the second NHL expansion team after the Philadelphia Flyers to win the Cup. Since their last Cup win in 1983, they were the third NHL team to win 4 consecutive championships and hold the NHL record for most consecutive playoff series' wins at 19 (stretching from the 1980 Playoffs to the 1984 Playoffs).
 The Edmonton Eskimos of the Canadian Football League won the first three Grey Cup championships of the decade (having won the last two of the previous decade), adding one more in 1987.
 The 1983 Cricket World Cup was won by India while the 1987 Cricket World Cup was won by Australia.
 The 1984 Winter Olympics were held in Sarajevo, Yugoslavia (now Sarajevo, Bosnia and Herzegovina). Yugoslavia became the second communist country to host the Olympic Games, but unlike the Soviet Union in 1980, there were no boycotts of the Games by Western countries.
 The 1984 Summer Olympics in Los Angeles were boycotted by the Soviet Union and most of the Communist world (China, Romania, and Yugoslavia participated in the games) in retaliation for the boycott of the 1980 Games in Moscow.
 The Jamaica national bobsled team received major media attention and stunned the world at the 1988 Winter Olympics in Calgary, Alberta, Canada for its unexpected good performance. The events surrounding the Jamaica bobsled team in 1988 would lead to the creation of the Disney movie Cool Runnings five years later.
 The 1988 Summer Olympics were held in Seoul, South Korea. Attempts to include North Korea in the games were unsuccessful and it boycotted along with six other countries, but with 160 nations participating, it had the highest attendance of any Olympics to date.
 FIA banned Group B rallying after a series of deaths and injuries took place in the 1986 season.
 Canadian hockey player Wayne Gretzky's rise to fame in the NHL coincided with the Edmonton Oilers' first four Stanley Cup championships (1984, 1985, 1987, and 1988) and becoming the second NHL dynasty team of the 1980s.
 On August 9, 1988, in what became the biggest trade in NHL history (also known as "The Trade Of The Century"), Wayne Gretzky was traded along with teammates Marty McSorley and Mike Krushelnyski from Edmonton to the Los Angeles Kings in exchange for Martin Gélinas, Jimmy Carson, three first round draft picks, and US$15 million cash (approximately $18 million CAD in 1988).
 American basketball player Michael Jordan burst onto the scene in the NBA during the 1980s, bringing a surge in popularity for the sport and becoming one of the most beloved sports icons in the United States.
 On June 8, 1986, the Boston Celtics defeated the Houston Rockets in Game 6 of the 1986 NBA Finals to capture a record 16th championship. Larry Bird was named Finals MVP.
 On November 26, 1986, Mike Tyson became the youngest boxing Heavyweight Champion in history at age 20.
 On March 31, 1985, the WWF presented the first WrestleMania at Madison Square Garden in New York City with an attendance of 19,121.
 On March 29, 1987, WrestleMania III had a record attendance of 93,173, the largest recorded attendance for a live indoor sporting event in North America until 2010. This also remained the WrestleMania attendance record until WrestleMania 32 at AT&T Stadium on April 3, 2016, in Arlington, Texas
 West Germany won the 1980 UEFA championship.
 Italy won the 1982 FIFA World Cup in Spain.
 France hosted and won the 1984 UEFA championship.
 Argentina won the 1986 FIFA World Cup in Mexico.  Diego Maradona produces the Goal of the Century. 
 The Netherlands won the 1988 UEFA championship.
 Hawthorn Football Club dominated Australian football, reaching seven successive VFL Grand Finals and winning the premiership in 1983, 1986, 1988, and 1989
 Liverpool F.C. were the most successful club side of the era, becoming English champions on six occasions (1980, 1982, 1983, 1984, 1986, and 1988) and winning two European Cups (1981, 1984). They also won the FA Cup in 1986, completing the first double in their history, and four consecutive League Cup titles from 1981 to 1984.
 Other highly successful club sides of the 1980s include Juventus (7 major honours won), Real Madrid (ten major honours won), Bayern Munich (nine titles won) PSV Eindhoven (four times Dutch champions and European Cup winners in 1988), and Flamengo (four times Brazilian champions, South American and International Cup winners in 1981).
 In the NFL, the San Francisco 49ers became the dynasty of the decade, winning four Super Bowls under the leadership of Joe Montana; the Chicago Bears won Super Bowl XX in January 1986, in which the team has been widely remembered for their defense; and the Washington Redskins also enjoyed success throughout the decade, winning two of their three Super Bowls under the leadership of head coach Joe Gibbs.
 Magic Johnson and Larry Bird became the two most popular NBA players during the decade while even facing against each other in three NBA Finals (1984, 1985, and 1987) continuing the storied Celtics-Lakers rivalry.
 Major League Baseball experienced parity and tense championship moments during the decade as the Philadelphia Phillies won their first World Series championship in 1980, the Kansas City Royals win their first World Series championship in a dramatic manner in 1985, the New York Mets win their second World Series championship in 1986 in a dramatic manner, the Minnesota Twins win their first World Series in 1987, and both the 1988 and 1989 World Series be remembered as Kirk Gibson's 1988 World Series home run, and the Loma Prieta Earthquake taking place occurring at 5:04 respectively.
 Disc ultimate league play is introduced to Canada in 1980 by Ken Westerfield starting the first disc ultimate league (TUC), in Toronto.

Video gaming

Popular video games include: Pac-Man, Super Mario Bros., The Legend of Zelda, Metroid, Donkey Kong, Frogger, Digger, Tetris, and Golden Axe.
Pac-Man (1980) was the first game to achieve widespread popularity in mainstream culture and the first game character to be popular in his own right. Handheld electronic LCD games was introduced into the youth market segment. The primary gaming computers of the 1980s emerged in 1982: the Commodore 64 and ZX Spectrum.
Nintendo finally decided in 1985 to release its Famicom (released in 1983 in Japan) in the United States under the name Nintendo Entertainment System (NES). It was bundled with Super Mario Bros. and it suddenly became a success. The NES dominated the American and Japanese market until the rise of the next generation of consoles in the early 1990s, causing some to call this time the Nintendo era. Sega released its 16-bit console, Mega Drive/Genesis, in 1988 in Japan and in North America in 1989.
In 1989, Nintendo released the Game Boy, a monochrome handheld console.

Fashion

The beginning of the decade saw the continuation of the clothing styles of the late 1970s and evolved into heavy metal fashion by the end. However,  fashion became more extravagant during the 1980s. The 1980s included  teased and colourfully-dyed hair, ripped jeans, neon clothing and many colours and different designs which at first were not accepted.

Significant hairstyle trends of the 1980s include the perm, the mullet, the Jheri curl, the hi-top fade, and big hair.

Significant clothing trends of the 1980s include shoulder pads, jean jackets, leather pants, leather aviator jackets, jumpsuits, Members Only jackets, skin-tight acid-washed jeans, Izod Lacoste and "preppy" polo shirts, leggings and leg warmers (popularized in the film Flashdance), off-the-shoulder shirts, and cut sweatshirts (popularized in the same film). 

Miniskirts returned to mainstream fashion in the mid-1980s after a ten-year absence, mostly made of denim material. From that point on, miniskirts and minidresses have remained in mainstream fashion to this day.

Makeup on the 1980s was aggressive, shining and colourful. Women emphasised their lips, eyebrows and cheeks with makeup. They used much blush and eyeliner.

Additional trends of the 1980s include athletic headbands, Ray-Ban Aviator sunglasses (popularized in the film Top Gun), Ray-Ban Wayfarer sunglasses (popularized in the films Risky Business and The Blues Brothers and the TV series Miami Vice), Swatch watches, and the Rubik's Cube (became a popular fad throughout the decade). Girls and women also wore jelly shoes, large crucifix necklaces, and brassieres all inspired by Madonna's "Like a Virgin" music video.

People

Actors & Entertainers 

 Lou Albano
 Alan Alda
 Kirstie Alley
 Julie Andrews
 Bea Arthur
 Dan Aykroyd
 Kevin Bacon
 Kim Basinger
 Linda Blair
 Mel Blanc
 Ernest Borgnine
 Matthew Broderick
 Pierce Brosnan
 Roscoe Lee Browne
 Yul Brynner
 Delta Burke
 Carol Burnett
 John Candy
 Johnny Carson
 Dixie Carter
 Jackie Chan
 Geraldine Chaplin
 Chevy Chase
 Andrew Dice Clay
 Glenn Close 
 Joan Collins
 Bill Cosby
 Kevin Costner
 Tom Cruise
 Billy Crystal
 Jamie Lee Curtis
 Tyne Daly
 Ted Danson
 Tony Danza
 Robert De Niro
 Johnny Depp
 Danny DeVito
 Kirk Douglas
 Michael Douglas
 David Doyle 
 Brad Dourif
 Patrick Duffy
 Emilio Estevez
 Linda Evans
 Albert Finney
 Jane Fonda 
 Harrison Ford
 John Forsythe
 Michael J. Fox 
 Dennis Franz
 Morgan Freeman
 Anthony Franciosa
 Eva Gabor
 Richard Gere
 Estelle Getty
 Mel Gibson
 Lillian Gish
 Sharon Gless
 Whoopi Goldberg
 Linda Gray
 Gene Hackman
 Larry Hagman
 Mark Hamill
 Tom Hanks
 Daryl Hannah
 Woody Harrelson
 David Hasselhoff
 Goldie Hawn
 Marilu Henner
 Charlton Heston
 Catherine Hicks
 Judd Hirsch
 Don Johnson
 James Earl Jones
 Andy Kaufman
 Sam Kinison
 Angela Lansbury
 David Letterman
 Judith Light
 Christopher Lloyd
 Heather Locklear
 Shelley Long
 Rob Lowe
 Steve Martin
 Rue McClanahan
 Eddie Murphy 
 Bill Murray
 Judd Nelson
 Bob Newhart
 Paul Newman
 Jack Nicholson
 Chuck Norris
 Al Pacino
 Sean Penn
 Rhea Perlman
 Vincent Price
 Victoria Principal 
 Phylicia Rashad
 John Ratzenberger
 Vanessa Redgrave
 Christopher Reeve
 Molly Ringwald
 Kurt Russell
 Chris Sarandon
 Arnold Schwarzenegger
 Tom Selleck
 Charlie Sheen
 Sylvester Stallone
 Patrick Stewart
 Meryl Streep
 Patrick Swayze
 Max von Sydow
 Alan Thicke
 Philip Michael Thomas
 John Travolta
 Kathleen Turner
 Dick Van Dyke
 Alex Vincent
 Sigourney Weaver
 George Wendt
 Danny Wells
 Gene Wilder
 Betty White
 Robin Williams
 Bruce Willis
 James Woods
 Steven Wright
 Burt Young

Athletes 

 Kareem Abdul-Jabbar
 Larry Bird
 Jimmy Connors
 Eric Dickerson
 John Elway
 Julius Erving
 Chris Evert
 Wayne Gretzky
 Hulk Hogan
 Florence Griffith Joyner
 Magic Johnson
 Michael Jordan
 Greg LeMond
 Carl Lewis
 Moses Malone
 Diego Maradona
 Dan Marino
 Don Mattingly
 John McEnroe
 Mark Messier
 Joe Montana
 Martina Navratilova
 Walter Payton
 Kirby Puckett
 Jerry Rice
 Cal Ripken Jr.
 Pete Rose
 Nolan Ryan
 Mike Schmidt
 Michel Platini
 Mike Singletary
 Ozzie Smith
 Marco van Basten
 Lawrence Taylor
 Isiah Thomas
 Mike Tyson

Musicians 

A-ha
AC/DC
Aerosmith
Air Supply
Amy Grant
Anthrax
Aretha Franklin
Atlantic Starr
Bad English
Bananarama
The Bangles
Barbra Streisand
The Beach Boys
Bee Gees
Belinda Carlisle
Berlin
Bette Midler
Bill Medley
Billy Idol
Billy Joel
Billy Ocean
Billy Vera
Blondie
Bob Marley
Bob Seger
Bobby Brown
Bobby McFerrin
Bon Jovi
Bonnie Tyler
Boston
Bruce Hornsby
Bruce Springsteen
Bryan Adams
Captain & Tennille
Cheap Trick
Chicago
Christopher Cross
Chuck Berry
Club Nouveau
Culture Club
The Cure
Cutting Crew
Cyndi Lauper
David Bowie
Debbie Gibson
Def Leppard
Deniece Williams
Depeche Mode
Dexys Midnight Runners
Diana Ross
Dionne Warwick
Dire Straits
Dizzy Gillespie
Dolly Parton
Donna Summer
Dschinghis Khan
Duran Duran
Earth Wind & Fire
Eddie Rabbitt
Elton John
The Escape Club
Eurythmics
Exposé
Falco
Fine Young Cannibals
Foreigner
Frank Sinatra
Frank Zappa
The Gap Band
Genesis
George Harrison
George Michael
Gloria Estefan
Gloria Gaynor
Gregory Abbott
Guns N' Roses
Hall & Oates
Heart
Huey Lewis and the News
The Human League
INXS
Irene Cara
Iron Maiden
The J. Geils Band
James Ingram
Jan Hammer
Janet Jackson
Jennifer Warnes
Joan Jett
Joe Cocker
John Lennon
John Mellencamp
John Parr
John Waite
Journey
Joy
Judas Priest
Judy Collins
Kate Bush
KC and the Sunshine Band
Kenny Loggins
Kenny Rogers
Kim Carnes
Kim Wilde
Kool & the Gang
Laura Branigan
Lionel Richie
Lipps Inc.
Lisa Lisa and Cult Jam
Los Lobos
Luther Vandross
Madonna
Marilyn Martin
Martika
Megadeth
Men at Work
Mentors
Metallica
Miami Sound Machine
Michael Damian
Michael Jackson
Michael McDonald
Michael Sembello
Mike and the Mechanics
Milli Vanilli
Mötley Crüe
Mr. Mister
New Kids on the Block
Olivia Newton-John
Pat Benatar
Patti Austin
Patti LaBelle
Paul Anka
Paul McCartney
Paul Young
Paula Abdul
Pet Shop Boys
Peggy Lee
Peter Cetera
Peter Gabriel
Phil Collins
Pink Floyd
Poison
The Police
Prince
Queen
Queensrÿche
Ray Parker Jr.
Ready for the World
REO Speedwagon
The Revolution
Richard Marx
Rick Astley
Rick Springfield
Ringo Starr
Robert Palmer
The Rolling Stones
Roxette
Run-DMC
Rupert Holmes
Rush
Sheena Easton
Sheriff
Siedah Garrett
Simon & Garfunkel
Simple Minds
Simply Red
Siouxsie and the Banshees
Slayer
Stars on 45
Starship
Steve Miller Band
Steve Winwood
Stevie Nicks
Stevie Ray Vaughan
Stevie Wonder
Sting
Survivor
Talking Heads
Tears for Fears
Terence Trent D'Arby
Tiffany Darwish
Tina Turner
Toni Basil
Toto
Twisted Sister
U2
UB40
Van Halen
Vangelis
Venom
Village People
Wham!
Whitesnake
Whitney Houston
Will to Power
Yes
Yoko Ono

See also

 1980s in fashion
 1980s in music
 1980s in television
 1980s in video gaming
 1980s in literature
 Hairstyles in the 1980s

Timeline
The following articles contain brief timelines which list the most prominent events of the decade:

1980 • 1981 • 1982 • 1983 • 1984 • 1985 • 1986 • 1987 • 1988 • 1989

References

Further reading

 Batchelor, Bob, and Scott F. Stoddart. The 1980s (American Popular Culture Through History) (2006) excerpt and text search
 Grant, James. Money of the Mind: How the 1980s Got That Way (1994) excerpt and text search
 Grimes, William. ed. The New York Times The Times of the Eighties The Culture, Politics, and Personalities that Shaped the Decade (2013)
 New York Times. New York Times Film Reviews: Best Picture Picks from the 1980s by The New York Times (2013) excerpt and text search
 Sirota, David. Back to Our Future: How the 1980s Explain the World We Live in Now—Our Culture, Our Politics, Our Everything (2011) excerpt and text search
 Stanfill, Sonnet. 80s Fashion: From Club to Catwalk (2013), 160pp
 Stewart, Graham. Bang! A History of Britain in the 1980s (2013) excerpt and text search
Turner, Alwyn. Rejoice, Rejoice!: Britain in the 1980s (2010)

 
20th century
1980s decade overviews